Stoke-upon-Trent was a parliamentary borough in Staffordshire, which elected two Members of Parliament (MPs) to the House of Commons from 1832 until 1885, and then one member from 1885 until 1918, when the borough was enlarged, renamed Stoke-on-Trent, and split into three single-member constituencies.

History
Stoke-upon-Trent was established as a borough by the Great Reform Act of 1832 to represent the Staffordshire Potteries, one of the most populous urban areas in England which had previously had no separate representation. The provisional contents, confirmed by the Parliamentary Boundaries Act 1832, formed a contiguous area comprising the townships of Tunstall, Burslem, Hanley, Shelton, Penkhull with Boothen (containing the town of Stoke-upon-Trent), Lane End, Longton, Fenton Vivian, and Fenton Culvert; hamlet of Sneyd; and vill of Rushton. At the time of the Reform Act the area had a population just over 50,000 (of whom 37,220 were in Stoke parish). In 1867 the boundaries were extended somewhat, to bring in a part of Burslem which had previously been excluded.

In further boundary changes implemented at the 1885 general election, the borough was split into two single-member constituencies, the northern part becoming a separate Hanley borough while the southern part (containing Longton and Fenton as well as Stoke itself) retained the Stoke-upon-Trent name; the new constituency had a population just under 100,000 by the time of the First World War. The industrial interests predominated, with the bulk of the voters being pottery workers or miners, although Stoke was a partly middle-class town; at first an apparently safe Liberal seat, it fell narrowly to the Unionists in both 1895 and 1900, perhaps partly because of discord between miners and potters within the local Liberal party. From 1906 it was held by John Ward as a Lib-Lab MP hostile to the Labour Party, who being from the Navvies' Union could defuse the mutual jealousies of the potters and miners.

By 1918, the pottery towns had been united for municipal purposes in a single Stoke-on-Trent county borough, and the parliamentary boundary changes which came into effect at that year's general election established a parliamentary borough of the same name to replace Stoke-upon-Trent and Hanley, divided into three constituencies: Stoke-on-Trent, Stoke; Stoke-on-Trent, Hanley; and Stoke-on-Trent, Burslem.

Members of Parliament

1832–1885

1885–1918

Election results

Elections in the 1830s

Heathcote resigned, causing a by-election.

Elections in the 1840s

Elections in the 1850s

Elections in the 1860s
Ricardo's death caused a by-election.

 

 

Beresford Hope resigned in order to contest a by-election at Cambridge University, causing a by-election.

Elections in the 1870s

 
 

Melly resigned, causing a by-election.

Elections in the 1880s

Elections in the 1890s 

 Caused by Bright's resignation.

Leveson-Gower was appointed Comptroller of the Household, requiring a by-election.

Elections in the 1900s

Elections in the 1910s 

General Election 1914–15:

Another General Election was required to take place before the end of 1915. The political parties had been making preparations for an election to take place and by the July 1914, the following candidates had been selected; 
Liberal-Labour: John Ward
Unionist: Samuel Joyce Thomas

References

Further reading
 The Constitutional Year Book for 1913 (London: National Union of Conservative and Unionist Associations, 1913)
 F W S Craig, "British Parliamentary Election Results 1832-1885" (2nd edition, Aldershot: Parliamentary Research Services, 1989)
 Michael Kinnear, The British Voter (London: BH Batsford, Ltd, 1968)
 Henry Pelling, Social Geography of British Elections 1885-1910 (London: Macmillan, 1967)
 J Holladay Philbin, Parliamentary Representation 1832 - England and Wales (New Haven: Yale University Press, 1965)
 Frederic A Youngs, jr, Guide to the Local Administrative Units of England, Vol II (London: Royal Historical Society, 1991)
 

Parliamentary constituencies in Stoke-on-Trent (historic)
Constituencies of the Parliament of the United Kingdom established in 1832
Constituencies of the Parliament of the United Kingdom disestablished in 1918